An ethics committee is a body responsible for ensuring that medical experimentation and human subject research are carried out in an ethical manner in accordance with national and international law.

Specific regions
An ethics committee in the European Union is a body responsible for oversight of medical or human research studies in EU member states. Local terms for a European ethics committee include:
 A Research Ethics Committee (REC) in the United Kingdom
 A Medical Research Ethics Committee (MREC) in the Netherlands.
 A Comité de Protection des Personnes (CPP) in France.

In the United States, an ethics committee is usually known as an institutional review board (IRB) or research ethics board (REB) and is dedicated to overseeing the rights and well-being of research subjects participating in scientific studies in the US. Similarly in Canada, the committee is called a Research Ethics Board (REB).

In Australia, an ethics committee in medical research refers to a Human Research Ethics Committee (HREC).

Since 1977 for the purposes of its subsidies to university research the Government of Canada, under the GOSA Act in the person (since 2015) of its Minister of Innovation, Science and Industry, donates annually to several of the federal funder agencies; these in turn disburse the funds into person-sized chunks. These persons typically are university professors, who are selected according to success in the wielding of soft power as measured by track record. In Canada, the Interagency Advisory Panel on Research Ethics (IAPRE) promotes "the ethical conduct of research involving human participants" under a document sometimes referred to as TCPS2.  The panel was jointly started in 2001 by three of the federal university research-funding agencies CIHR, NSERC, and SSHRC. The IAPRE FAQ says that "Failure to comply with the requirements of the TCPS2 by researchers or their institution may result in a recourse by the Agencies." Other organizations have opted to adhere to the TCPS2, for example the National Research Council Canada, the Department of National Defence and Health Canada. The IAPRE maintains that some private REBs have opted to adhere to TCPS2 as well. It is worthwhile to note that not all research in Canada is dependent on federal funds.

History

One of the most fundamental ethical principles in human experimentation is that the experimenter should not subject the participants in the experiment to any procedure they would not be willing to undertake themselves.  This idea was first codified in the Nuremberg Code in 1947, which was a result of the trials of Nazi doctors at the Nuremberg trials accused of murdering and torturing victims in valueless experiments.  Several of these doctors were hanged.  Point five of the Nuremberg Code requires that no experiment should be conducted that is dangerous to the subjects unless the experimenters themselves also take part.  The Nuremberg Code has influenced medical experiment codes of practice around the world, as has the exposure of experiments that have since failed to follow it such as the notorious Tuskegee syphilis experiment.

Another ethical principle is that volunteers must stand to gain some benefit from the research, even if that is only a remote future possibility of treatment being found for a disease that they only have a small chance of contracting.  Tests on experimental drugs are sometimes conducted on sufferers of an untreatable condition. If the researcher does not have that condition then there can be no possible benefit to them personally. For instance, Ronald C. Desrosiers in responding to why he did not test an AIDS vaccine he was developing on himself said that he was not at risk of AIDS so could not possibly benefit.

An important element of an ethics committee's oversight is to ensure that informed consent of the subjects has been given. Informed consent is the principle that the volunteers in the experiment should fully understand the procedure that is going to take place, be aware of all the risks involved, and give their consent to taking part in the experiment beforehand.  The principle of informed consent was first enacted in the U.S. Army's research into Yellow fever in Cuba in 1901.  However, there was no general or official guidance at this time.  That remained the case until the yellow fever program was referenced in the drafting of the Nuremberg Code.  This was further developed in the Declaration of Helsinki in 1964 by the World Medical Association which has since become the foundation for ethics committees' guidelines.

The convening of ethics committees to approve the research protocol in human experiments was first written into international guidelines in the first revision to the Declaration of Helsinki (Helsinki II, 1975).  A controversy arose over the fourth revision (1996) concerning placebo trials in developing countries. It was claimed that US trials of the anti-HIV drug zidovudine in India was in breach of this requirement. This led the US Food and Drug Administration to cease incorporating new revisions of Helsinki and refer instead to the 1989 revision.

Ethics committees are also made a requirement in International Ethical Guidelines for Biomedical Research Involving Human Subjects, produced by the Council for International Organizations of Medical Sciences (CIOMS), a body set up by the World Health Organization.  First published in 1993, the CIOMS guidelines have no legal force but they have been influential in the drafting of national regulations for ethics committees.  The COIMS guidelines are focused on practice in developing countries.

See also
Guidelines for human subject research

References

Bibliography
 Lawrence K. Altman, Who Goes First?: The Story of Self-experimentation in Medicine, University of California Press, 1987 .
 S. C. Gandevia, "Self-experimentation, ethics, and efficacy", Monash Bioethics Review (Ethics Committee Supplement), vol. 23, no. 4, 2005.
 Povl Riis, "Planning of scientific-ethical committees", British Medical Journal, vol. 2, pp. 173–174, 1977.
 Emily A. Largent, "Recently proposed changes to legal and ethical guidelines governing human subjects research", Journal of Law and the Biosciences, vol. 3, iss. 1, pp. 206–216.
 R. J. Levine, "Some recent developments in the international guidelines on the ethics of research involving human subjects", Annals of the New York Academy of Sciences, vol. 918, pp. 170–178, November 2000.
 Robert V Carlson, Kenneth M. Boyd, David J Webb, "The revision of the Declaration of Helsinki: past, present and future", British Journal of Clinical Pharmacology, vol. 57, iss. 6, pp. 695–713, June 2004.

Medical ethics
Design of experiments
Human subject research
Clinical research ethics
Drug safety
Social research
Ethics organizations
Ethics and statistics
Applied ethics
Regulatory compliance